Events from the 2nd century in Ireland.

100s
106
Battle of Moin An Chatha, in Magh Line, Dal Araidhe

140s
140
Greek astronomer and cartographer Ptolemy provided the earliest known reference to human habitation in the area now known as Dublin. In around 140 he referred to a settlement he called Eblana Civitas

150s
157
Battle of Tuath Amrois

Notes
List of Published Texts at CELT — University College Cork's Corpus of Electronic Texts project has the full list of Irish Annals.

 
Ireland